Your Ghost Is a Gift is American metalcore band Ligeia's first full-length album released on March 21, 2006.

Track listing 

 "Beyond a Doubt" - 2:28
 "I'm Sorry You're Ugly" - 2:42
 "Heart Attack" - 4:08
 "Judas Complex" - 3:40
 "The Blackout" - 5:37
 "Household Stereotypes" - 3:54
 "Makin' Love to a Murderer" (feat. Philip Labonte of All That Remains)- 3:08
 "Swollen Eye View" - 3:45
 "Always, Forever" - 4:18
 "Dead Man's Bride" - 3:58
 "Wishing Wells" - 5:22

Credits 
Matthew Bennett - bass 
Phil Fonseca - drums
Chris Keane - guitar  
Ryan Ober - guitar 
Keith Holuk - vocals

References

2006 debut albums
Ferret Music albums
Ligeia (band) albums
Albums with cover art by Sons of Nero